Ángelo Jasiel Balanta (born 1 July 1990) is a Colombian professional footballer who plays as a winger or a striker for National League club Dagenham & Redbridge.

Club career
Born in Cali, Colombia, Balanta moved to England when he was 5 and grew up in Fulham as a youth where he attended Hurlingham & Chelsea Secondary school. he then attended south thames college for a year, completing a construction course. Balanta progressed through the Queens Park Rangers youth system before being promoted to the first team in 2007. He had been spotted by QPR scouts playing for CB Hounslow United who play in the Combined Counties League. He signed his first professional contract with QPR in January 2008, which will keep him at the club until 2010 and was given shirt number 36.

He made his first team debut when he was brought on as a substitute, replacing Ben Sahar, against Crystal Palace on 4 December 2007. He made his first start against Watford on 29 December 2007. In the 10th minute of the game, Balanta put Dexter Blackstock through with a looping ball which resulted in him being fouled and a penalty kick being given, which was scored by Martin Rowlands. In the 40th minute, Balanta won an aerial challenge against Lloyd Doyley and found unmarked Martin Rowlands with a lob. Rowlands scored with a chip over Richard Lee from an acute angle. Balanta is highly rated at QPR and is the latest talent to break through the youth set up at Loftus Road. On 5 January 2008, he made his FA Cup debut against Chelsea, coming on as a 65th-minute substitute for new signing Hogan Ephraim. On 23 February 2008, Balanta scored his first senior goal for QPR against Sheffield United at Loftus Road. The goal came in the 19th minute when Hogan Ephraim whipped in a cross into the near post where Balanta latched onto the ball. Rangers drew the game 1–1.

At the start of the 2008–09 season, new manager Iain Dowie handed Balanta the number 19 shirt and gave him his first start in a League Cup third round game away at Swindon Town, which was won 3–2, with Balanta scoring the first goal. On 13 November 2008, Balanta moved on loan to League Two side Wycombe Wanderers for three months. He was recalled from his loan spell two weeks early having scored three goals in 11 games.

In June 2010, Balanta moved on loan to Milton Keynes Dons for the entire 2010–11 season. On 1 August 2011 Balanta returned to MK Dons for a five-month loan.

In January 2012, Balanta returned to Queens Park Rangers and was given the number 46 shirt. In their game against Aston Villa he was placed on the bench.

On 26 March 2013, Balanta joined League One side Yeovil Town on loan until the end of the 2012–13 season. Balanta made seven appearances for Yeovil and was an unused substitute in the 2013 League One play-off final as Yeovil beat Brentford 2–1 to secure promotion to the Football League Championship. On 1 July 2014, Balanta was released by QPR after seven years at the club, and joined Bristol Rovers. Balanta had a successful year at Rovers in the Football Conference, scoring a penalty in the club's penalty shootout victory over Grimsby Town in the play-off final. However, he decided to join Carlisle in June 2015.

On 28 July 2016, Balanta joined National League side Boreham Wood on a one-year deal.

On 22 October 2018, he signed for National League Dagenham & Redbridge for an undisclosed fee.

International career
In September 2008, the England Under-19 side placed Balanta on standby as a replacement were a player to withdraw from the team.

Career statistics

Honours

Club
Yeovil Town

 League One play-offs: 2013

Bristol Rovers
National League play-offs: 2015

Individual
National League Player of the Month: March 2021

References

External links

1990 births
Living people
Footballers from Cali
Colombian footballers
Association football forwards
Queens Park Rangers F.C. players
Wycombe Wanderers F.C. players
Milton Keynes Dons F.C. players
Yeovil Town F.C. players
Bristol Rovers F.C. players
Carlisle United F.C. players
Boreham Wood F.C. players
Dagenham & Redbridge F.C. players
English Football League players
National League (English football) players
Colombian expatriate footballers
Colombian expatriate sportspeople in England
Expatriate footballers in England